Van Hollaway is a former American football coach.  He served as the head football coach at Bethany College in Lindsborg, Kansas, from 1974 to 1975, compiling a record of 9–11.

Head coaching record

References

Year of birth missing
Possibly living people
Bethany Swedes football coaches